"Genius Move" is a 1987 non-album single by That Petrol Emotion.

Track listing 7"

Side A

Track listing 12"

Personnel 
"Genius Move" produced by Roli Mosimann, remixed by John Leckie
"Party Games" produced by Barry Andrews for the Janice Long Radio 1 show.
"Mouthcrazy (Live)" produced by Mike Johnson
 Steve Mack: Vocals
 John O'Neill: Guitar
 Raymond O'Gorman: Guitar
 Damian O'Neill: Bass Guitar
 Ciaran McLaughlin: Drums

References

1987 songs
That Petrol Emotion songs
Virgin Records singles